Gopi Krishna Nema is an Indian politician and member of the Bharatiya Janata Party. Nema is a former member of the Madhya Pradesh Legislative Assembly from the Indore-3 constituency in Indore district. In August 2018, Nema was appointed the president of BJP for Indore city.

References 

Politicians from Indore
Bharatiya Janata Party politicians from Madhya Pradesh
Madhya Pradesh MLAs 1993–1998
Living people
21st-century Indian politicians
Year of birth missing (living people)